Weizhou or Wei Zhou may refer to:

Weizhou Island, Haicheng District, Beihai, Guangxi
Weizhou, Guangxi, town in Haicheng District that includes the island
Weizhou, Hebei, town in Jingxing County, Hebei
Weizhou, Wenchuan County, town and the county seat of Wenchuan County, Sichuan

Historical prefectures
Wei Prefecture (Shandong), a prefecture between the 6th and 14th centuries in modern Shandong 
Wei Prefecture (Hebei)
Wei Prefecture (Henan), a prefecture between the 6th and 13th centuries in modern Henan
Wei Prefecture (Gansu), a prefecture between the 9th and 12th centuries in modern Gansu and Ningxia

See also
Yu Prefecture (Hebei), a historical prefecture also translated as Wei Prefecture
Zhou Wei (disambiguation) 
Wei (disambiguation)